Atractus charitoae is a species of snake in the family Colubridae. The species can be found  Colombia.

References 

Atractus
Reptiles of Colombia
Endemic fauna of Colombia
Snakes of South America
Reptiles described in 2004